Hillcrest Hospital may refer to:

 Hillcrest Hospital, in Cuyahoga County, Ohio
 Hillcrest Hospital (Pittsfield, Massachusetts)

See also
 UC San Diego Medical Center, Hillcrest